The ZAI Awards (Hudobný fond or HF) are a Slovak music accolade presented by Zväz autorov a interprétov populárnej hudby (ZAI) to recognize outstanding achievements in the industry for the preceding year in the region. In the early phase, the annual ceremonies were held in association with the local Music Fund (HF) and International Federation of the Phonographic Industry Slovakia (SNS IFPI). For that reason, their follow-up equivalents were frequently renamed; once after the American Gramies (1996–1997).

Following a 1997 protest of the U.S. NARAS management against the Czech music awards, also called likewise, the Slovak organization decided to change the adopted name too, renaming then trophies after the Artmedia Music Academy (1998–2000), also established by ZAI.

In 2001, the event was separately rebranded by SNS IFPI for the Aurel Awards (2001–2007), for a change, prior to their hiatus. Restored by the ZAI union in 2011 under their original title, the current awards are presented on a biennial basis, honoring mostly the hosting achievements in the music genre since. As of 2015, twenty annual ceremonies were held, with thirteen credited to ZAI, and seven to now discontinued SNS IFPI.

History 
 1990–2000: ZAI Awards
 1996–1997: As Grammy Awards (Grammy West '96 ▪ Grammy Slovakia '97)
 1998–2000: As Artmedia Awards
 2001–2007: Aurel Awards held instead
 2008–2010: Not held
 2011–present: ZAI Awards (held biennially)

Categories

Current awards 
 Vocal Artist or Ensemble • Held since, excluding 1998–2000 and 2011.
 New Artist • Held since, excluding 2011.
 Album • Held since 1991, excluding 2011.
 Radio Station • Held since 2011.
 Radio Host • Held since 2011.
 Music Festival • Held since 2011.
 Music Club • Held since 2011.
 Music Presenter • Held since 2011.

 Special awards
 Hall of Fame • Lifetime achievement award, formerly known as Grand Prix (1990–2000), given for outstanding contributions to the industry, mainly for performing.

Retired awards 

 Vocal Ensemble • Held in 1998–2000.
 Vocal Artist • Held in 1998–1999.
 Vocal Male Artist • Held in 2000.
 Vocal Female Artist • Held in 2000.
 Record
 Song
 Producer • Held in 1991–2000.
 Music Video
 Writer • Given for lyrics. Held until 2000, excluding 1998.
 Instrumental Artist • Held until 2000.
 Cover Art • Held in 1998–2000.
 Dancefloor Artist • Held in 1996–1997.
 Vocal Male Artist – Classical • Held only in 2000.
 Vocal Female Artist – Classical • Held only in 2000.
 Vocal Ensemble – Classical • Held only in 2000.
 Vocal Male Artist – Traditional • Held only in 2000.
 Vocal Female Artist – Traditional • Held only in 2000.
 Vocal Ensemble – Traditional • Held only in 2000.
 Album – Traditional • Held only in 2000.
 Music Act • Held only in 2000.
 Special Mention Award • Individual achievement award, given only in 1998–1999.

Ceremonies 
The listed years are of official release, annual ceremonies are held the following year.

 1st ZAI Awards (1990)
 2nd ZAI Awards (1991)
 3rd ZAI Awards (1992)
 4th ZAI Awards (1993)
 5th ZAI Awards (1994)
 6th ZAI Awards (1995)
 7th ZAI Grammy West Awards (1996)
 8th ZAI Grammy Slovakia Awards (1997)
 9th ZAI Artmedia Awards (1998)
 10th ZAI Artmedia Awards (1999)
 11th ZAI Artmedia Awards (2000)
 12th ZAI Awards (2011)
 13th ZAI Awards (2013)

See also 
 Slávik Awards

References

External links 
 19902000 > ZAI Awards > Winners (at ZAI.eu.sk)

 1990 (at SME)
 
 
 1993 (at SME)
 
 1995 (at SME)
 1996 (at SME)
 1997 (at SME)
 1998 (at SME)
 1999 (at SME)
 2000 (at SME)
 2001–2007 (held Aurel Awards)
 
 
 
 2011 (by TASR)
 
 2013 (by TASR)
 

 
Union of Authors and Performers
Slovak culture
Slovak music awards
Awards established in 1990